Pär Uno Hurtig (born 7 December 1957) is a Swedish rower. He competed in the men's coxless four event at the 1980 Summer Olympics.

References

1957 births
Living people
Swedish male rowers
Olympic rowers of Sweden
Rowers at the 1980 Summer Olympics
Sportspeople from Gothenburg